The 2009 Virginia gubernatorial election took place in Virginia on November 3, 2009. The incumbent Governor, Democrat Tim Kaine, was not eligible to run due to term limits established by the Virginia Constitution, though others in the state's executive branch were not restricted. (Virginia is the only state that prohibits a Governor from serving consecutive terms.) Republican Bob McDonnell was elected as Governor as part of a Republican sweep. Republican Bill Bolling was reelected as lieutenant governor, and Republican Ken Cuccinelli was elected as attorney general. The winners were inaugurated on January 16, 2010, and served until January 11, 2014.

State Senator Creigh Deeds was selected as the Democratic nominee, having defeated former Democratic National Committee Chairman Terry McAuliffe and former state Delegate Brian Moran in the Democratic primary election. This was the first contested Democratic primary in two decades. McDonnell, a former state Attorney General, was selected at his party's nominating convention. The two major candidates competed in the 2005 Virginia Attorney General election, and were in a rematch, but in the Governor's race. McDonnell defeated Deeds in the general election by a margin of 59%–41%, much larger than the previous Attorney General election. This would be the last time until 2021 that a Republican would win any statewide election in Virginia. This is also the last time any of the following counties have voted Republican in a statewide race: Albemarle, Fairfax, Prince William, Henrico, Sussex, Brunswick, and the independent city of Suffolk.

Democratic primary

Candidates 

 Terry McAuliffe, former Chairman of the Democratic National Committee and chair of the Hillary Clinton 2008 presidential campaign
 Creigh Deeds, State Senator from Warm Springs
 Brian Moran, former State Delegate from Alexandria

Campaign 

The Democratic primary campaign for governor unofficially began on December 13, 2007 when State Senator Creigh Deeds, who ran for Attorney General of Virginia in 2005, announced that he would run for the Democratic nomination. State Delegate Brian Moran, brother of Congressman Jim Moran, joined Deeds on January 4, 2008, when he established a political action committee. For the following year (before McAuliffe indicated his intentions to run), Deeds and Moran squared off picking up endorsements, and raising money. On January 3, 2009, McLean resident Terry McAuliffe, former chairman of the Democratic National Committee and chairman of Hillary Clinton's 2008 presidential campaign announced that he was also running. The Democratic primary, which took place on June 9, 2009, was the first contested in over twenty years.

Moran received many endorsements from members of the State Democratic Party as well as the mayors of the Hampton Roads area. Deeds picked up support from Northern and Western Virginia, such as the endorsement from U.S. Congressman Rick Boucher. The area of strength for Deeds was concentrated in Western and Southern Virginia, and the area of strength for Moran consisted mostly of Eastern Virginia with both reaching out to Northern Virginian voters.

The race was close from the beginning, with McAuliffe considered to be a semi "front-runner" due to his lead in the polls and big campaign war chest.  However, in the last few weeks of the race, Deeds began to surge up in the polls.  By election night, June 9, Deeds swept to victory.  Creigh Deeds spent $14.49 for each vote on the Democratic primary election.  Terry McAuliffe spent $68.25 for each vote on the Democratic primary election.

Endorsements

Fundraising
Fundraising totals through June 30, 2009, from the Virginia Public Access Project.

Polling

Results

Republican convention 
Attorney General Bob McDonnell first announced his intention to run at American Legion's Boys State of Virginia 2007. This was the sixth consecutive Virginian gubernatorial election in which an Attorney General ran. 

McDonnell was the only Republican candidate to file with the election board before the November 2008 deadline. As a result, there was no Republican Party primary. McDonnell accepted the Republican nomination at a state convention on May 30, 2009, in Richmond. Other potential candidates for the Republican nomination, lieutenant governor Bill Bolling and former Senator George Allen, both declined to run.

Chairman of the Republican National Committee Michael Steele had said that the election for governor of Virginia is one of the most important elections for the Republican Party.

General election
Deeds and McDonnell both ran for Attorney General of Virginia in 2005. McDonnell won by just over 300 votes, in the same election in which Tim Kaine was elected Governor with 52% of the vote.

The main themes of the election were the economy, transportation, and jobs.

The first debate was in Hot Springs, Virginia on July 25.

Vice President Joe Biden campaigned for Deeds in Henrico County, Virginia, a suburb of Richmond, Virginia on July 16. Also attending were Richmond Mayor Dwight Clinton Jones, state Senator A. Donald McEachin (D-Henrico), and Virginia first lady Anne Holton.

On August 6, President Barack Obama and Governor Tim Kaine campaigned for Deeds in McLean, Virginia.

Deeds is from Bath County, Virginia, a rural area of fewer than 5,000 people, where John McCain received over 55% of the vote. McDonnell is from Virginia Beach, which McCain won with 49.9%.

Fundraising

Predictions

Polling

with McAuliffe

with Moran

Results

Results by County

See also
2009 Virginia elections
2009 United States gubernatorial elections
Governors of Virginia

Notes

References

External links
2009 Virginia Gubernatorial General Election: Robert McDonnell (R) vs Creigh Deeds (D) chart of aggregated polling results from Pollster.com
2009 Virginia Governor chart of aggregated polling results from VoteForAmerica.net
Official results from Virginia State Board of Elections

Campaign Websites (Archived)
Bob McDonnell campaign site
Creigh Deeds campaign site
Terry McAuliffe campaign site
Brian Moran campaign site

Virginia
November 2009 events in the United States
Gubernatorial
2009